Intriga tras cámaras is an upcoming Venezuelan telenovela written by Carmelo Castro, from a screenplay by Henry Galué. The series is produced by Quimera Producciones. The filming of the production began in January 2019, was mostly filmed in Caracas, Venezuela, and consists of 60 episodes of one hour. It stars Alexandra Braun, Adrián Delgado, and Carlos Guillermo Haydon.

On 4 May 2020, ABC.com confirmed that production of the telenovela temporarily suspended due to the COVID-19 pandemic in Venezuela.

Cast 
 Alexandra Braun
 Adrián Delgado
 Carlos Guillermo Haydon
 Antonio Delli
 Zandú Montoya as Diego
 Fernanda Zabian as Daniela
 Ana Karina Casanova
 Rafael Oropeza as Jimmy Bustamante
 Martin Almonetti as Ramses
Simón Pestana
Antonio Cuevas
Henry Soto
Luiseth Materán
Asdrúbal Blanco
Gerardo Longo

References 

Upcoming telenovelas
Venezuelan telenovelas
Spanish-language telenovelas
Spanish-language television shows
Television productions suspended due to the COVID-19 pandemic